Torshak or Tarashok or Tareshok may refer to:
 Torshak, Ilam
 Torshak, Khuzestan